Yanawara (in the local language, also spelled Yanahuara) is a mountain in the Andes of Peru, about  high. It is located in the Puno Region, Lampa Province, on the border of the districts Ocuviri, Paratía and Santa Lucía. Yanawara lies east of Ananta Lake.

References

Mountains of Peru
Mountains of Puno Region